NA-259 Panjgur-cum-Kech is a constituency for the National Assembly of Pakistan. It comprises the districts of Panjgur, and Kech from the province of Balochistan. It was created in 2022 by taking parts of Panjgur District and Kech District from NA-270 (Panjgur-cum-Washuk-cum-Awaran) and NA-271 (Kech) respectively.

Assembly Segments

Members of Parliament

Since 2018: NA-270 Panjgur-cum-Washuk-cum-Awaran

Election 2018

General elections were held on 25 July 2018.

See also
NA-258 Gwadar-cum-Kech
NA-260 Chagai-cum-Nushki-cum-Kharan-cum-Washuk

References 

National Assembly Constituencies of Pakistan